CCDA may refer to:
Cisco CCDA certification
Consolidated Clinical Document Architecture